The Coveted Mirror was a graphical text-based adventure game published for the Apple II. It was created by Eagle Berns and Holly Thomason and released by Penguin Software in 1983.

Plot
The land of Starbury was taken over by Voar the evil.  During his grasp for power, Voar tried to seize the magic mirror but broke it into five pieces; luckily, he was only able to grab four of the pieces. it is up to you, the hero, to find the fifth and final piece in order to break Voar's rule and save the people of Starbury.

Gameplay

The Coveted Mirror utilizes a text parser, in which the player types commands to perform actions in the game.
Additionally, part of the challenge of The Coveted Mirror involves frequent, timed escapes from the jail tower.  Within a limited timeframe, indicated by an hourglass, the player must search the castle, find objects, and talk to people and return to the cell by the time the jailer makes his rounds.  This timed element adds another dimension to the exploration and puzzle solving. The original version also worked several arcade style scenes into the solution of the adventure, such as a jousting game and a fishing game. The later Comprehend version released in 1986 replaced the two-word parser with a full-sentence parser and was released for more computer systems than the original Apple II version, but omitted the arcade-style scenes and replaced them with other puzzles.

Reception
Softline called The Coveted Mirror "a great balance of magic and mystery". The magazine liked the "intelligent" parser with built-in hints and the "remarkably well done yet nonviolent" arcade sequences, and concluded that it "is probably the best graphic adventure of the year".

See also
List of graphic adventure games

References

External links
Play online at Virtual Apple
Game information
Review in GAMES Magazine

1983 video games
Adventure games
Apple II games
Apple II-only games
Video games developed in the United States
Penguin Software games
Single-player video games